The Interim Committee on Un-American Activities or Joint Legislative Committee on Un-American Activities, most commonly known as the Canwell Committee, (1947-1949) was a special investigative committee of the Washington State Legislature which in 1948 investigated the influence of the Communist Party USA in Washington state. Named after its chairman, Albert F. Canwell, the committee concentrated upon communist influence in the Washington Commonwealth Federation and its relationship to the Democratic Party in Washington, as well alleged Communist Party membership of certain faculty members at the University of Washington in Seattle.

The Canwell Committee is remembered as one of a number of state-level investigative committees patterned after the House Committee on Un-American Activities (HUAC) of the United States Congress. The committee ultimately published two printed volumes collecting the testimony of witnesses before it. The committee was terminated by the Washington legislature in 1949, following the electoral defeat of its chairman and several of its members in the elections of 1948.

Background

Becoming a state only in November 1889, Washington was a relative latecomer into the United States of America. As was the case in Texas, Oklahoma, Kansas, and the Dakota Territory, an indigenous frontier radicalism was prevalent in the state, making the Socialist Party of Washington one of the largest state affiliates of the Socialist Party of America on a per capita basis of the pre-World War I progressive era. Seattle had been the site of a General Strike in February 1919 which had captivated the attention of the nation.

Although the Socialist Party of Washington did not survive 1919 upheavals in the national party, many socialists continued to live and work in the state. The Farmer-Labor Party received significant support from Washington voters in the election of 1920, as did progressive presidential candidate Robert M. La Follette independent campaign in the 1924 election. The state's national reputation for a left-of-center political climate is demonstrated by Postmaster General James Farley's quip that the United States of America consists of "forty-seven states and the Soviet of Washington."

In 1935 a group of Washington socialists, labor activists, and social democrats formed the Commonwealth Builders organization to promote social democratic goals within the Washington State Democratic party. Founders included the socialist writer and KIRO radio personality Howard Costigan. Costigan would later renounce communism after reconverting to Catholicism and become a significant cooperating witness for McCarthyist anti-communist investigations during the second Red-Scare. 

The Commonwealth Builders held a statewide convention in 1936 which resulted in an expansion of their activities under the new name The Washington Commonwealth Federation (WCF). The organization explicitly sought to model itself on the recently politically successful Cooperative Commonwealth Federation in Canada.

When the Soviet Union's Comintern adopted a Popular Front strategy through which it advocated and engaged in common political efforts with liberals and social democrats against the global rise of fascism, socialist members of the WCF, including Costigan, joined the Communist Party USA and moved the WCF into alignment with the global anti-fascist program propagated by Comintern. As European fascism spread and Stalin consolidated power through his theory of Socialism in one country the WCF members antifascist activities and their support for the USSR's foreign policy became deeply entangled.  

In 1946, Albert F. Canwell, Republican from Spokane's Fifth District was elected to the Washington House of Representatives. Canwell ran an anti-communist campaign and on entering office he began coordinating with the House Committee on Un-American Activities (HUAC) by requesting copies of files created by its investigations into Washington residents. Canwell then drafted a bill to establish a Washington State "Joint Legislative Committee on Un-American Activities," (Canwell Committee) modeled on HUAC and a similar committee formed in California. The Canwell Committee included three House members and three Senate members plus Canwell himself who served as the committee's chair.

Members

The Interim Committee on Un-American Activities of the Washington State Legislature was established on the last day of the 1947 legislative session.  On March 8, 1947, Washington State's House Concurrent Resolution No. 10 established the Joint Legislative Fact-Finding Committee on Un-American Activities. House Speaker Herbert M. Hamblen appointed Canwell as chairman. The committee becomes known as the "Canwell Committee."  The resolution directed the committee to "investigate the activities of groups and organizations whose membership includes persons who are Communists, or any other organization known or suspected to be dominated or controlled by a foreign power."

Members came from:
 Washington State House of Representatives:
 Albert F. Canwell (chairman)
  Sydney A. Stevens
 Grant C. Stisson
 George F. Yantis
 Washington State Senate:
 R.L. Rutter Jr.
 Thomas H. Bienz
 Harold G. Kimball

In practice, five of the committee's seven members were Republicans and only two Democrats.  One was a member of the conservative American Legion. Hamblen appointed one liberal Democrat, Representative George F. Yantis, but Yantis died in December 1947 before the committee began to conduct its public hearings.

Hearings

The Canwell Committee held its hearings at the Seattle Armory.

On January 27, 1948, the Canwell Committee convened its first hearing.  The subject was subversion within the Washington Pension Union.

On July 19, 1948, the Canwell Committee held its second hearings on the subject was subversion within the University of Washington.  Witnesses included George Hewitt, who claimed he had taught University of Washington professor Melvin Rader at a "highly secret Communist school at Briehl's Farm, near Kingston, New York, for a period of about six weeks in the Summer of 1938 or 1939."  Rader later pursued Hewitt for perjury.

Canwell also invited anti-communists Howard Rushmore and J. B. Matthews to testify before the committee about Alger Hiss. Alger Hiss had not yet been prosecuted.
Rushmore testified for three days including testimony about more than a dozen members of the Communist Party arrested following the federal investigations).  Rushmore also claimed that "moles" existed in the federal government.  He named Harold Ware, Lee Pressman, Donald Hiss, John Abt, Charles Kramer, Nathan Gregory Silvermaster, and Joseph P. Lash.  Fred Neindorff of the Seattle Post Intelligencer and Ashley Holden of the Spokesman-Review both covered the story; U.S. Secretary of State George C. Marshall personally called both newspapers to quash the story.

During taping for an oral history in 1997, Canwell said, "We wished to put the Hiss case in the record, and there’s testimony by them about atomic scientists and others who were questionable characters."  The only scientist whose name Canwell could remember was J. Robert Oppenheimer of the Manhattan Project.  "There were numerous others," Canwell said, but he would have to go back and read the record to call "all their names" accurately.  Asked to "characterize" Oppenheimer, Canwell said he agreed with conservative journalist Westbrook Pegler:  he paid dues in the Communist Party, he was married to a Communist, and sleeping with at least one other one.  Of the two, Rushmore and Matthews, Canwell explained, "Rushmore was principally brought out to testify on Hiss and the atomic scientists," while Matthews helped on the subject of universities.

Dissolution

In November 1948, Canwell lost his re-election; the committee issued its final report in January 1949.

In 1997, during oral history interviews, Canwell explained:    One of the reasons that I tried over and over to be elected to Congress was that I needed the power base to do what I knew needed doing–what I wanted to do... Nobody paid my way, and that was what I was always confronted with. That’s more or less the total Canwell operation–it’s a one-man FBI with no funds.

References

Further reading

 Albert F. Canwell and Timothy Frederick, Albert F. Canwell: An Oral History, Olympia, WA: Washington State Oral History Program, Office of the Secretary of State, 1997.
 Vern Countryman, Un-American Activities in the State of Washington. Ithaca, NY: Cornell University Press, 1951.
 Vern Countryman, "Washington: The Canwell Commission," in Walter Gellhorn (ed.), The States and Subversion. Ithaca, NY: Cornell University Press, 1952; pp. 283–357.
 Melvin Rader, False Witness. Seattle, WA: University of Washington Press, 1969.

Publications

 Albert F. Canwell, et al., First Report, Un-American Activities in Washington State, 1948. Olympia, WA: The committee, 1948.
 Albert F. Canwell, et al., Second Report, Un-American Activities in Washington State, 1948. Olympia, WA: The committee, 1948.

External links
 James Gregory (general editor), "Special Section: Canwell Hearings" Communism in Washington State: History and Memory, University of Washington, 2009–2012. Including complete, digitized transcripts of the hearings, historical photographs, documents and essays.
 Susan Gilmore, "The Cold War And Albert Canwell: The 1948 Anti-Communist Hearings Earned The Freshman Legislator An Instant Reputation — And Shattered Lives," Seattle Times, Aug. 2, 1998.
 Nancy Wick, "Seeing Red: Fifty Years Ago, a Hearing on "Un-American" Activities Tore the UW Campus Apart, Setting a Precedent for Faculty Firings across Academe," Columns, December 1997.

Archives 
Register of Richard Gladstein Papers 1930–1969. At the California Library for Social Studies and Research.
Albrt M. Ottenheimer Papers. 1935–1980. 32 linear ft. (60 containers, 1 package) At the Unvesity of Oregon Special Collections and University Archives.
 University of Washington - Photos
Finding aids at the University of Washington Libraries Special Collections:
Ted Astley Papers . 1920–1994. 1.42 cubic ft. (2 boxes and 3 photographs).
John S. Daschbach Papers.1936-1957. 3.78 cubic ft. (9 boxes).
Garland O. Ethel Papers. 1913–1980. 13.00 cubic ft. (13 boxes).
Ralph H Gundlach Papers. 1918–1974. 1.47 cubic ft. (4 boxes).
Washington Committee for Academic Freedom Records. 1947–1948. .84 cubic ft. (2 boxes).
Howard Costigan Papers.1933-1989. 6 Cubic ft. (6 boxes and 1 package).
Thomas C. Rabbit Papers. 1943–1961. .42 Cubic ft. (1 box).
Charles M. Gates Papers. 1881–1963. 24.84  cubic ft.
Melvin Jacobs Papers. 1918-1974 78.23 cubic ft.
John Caughlan Papers. 1933–1999. 54.44 cubic feet (85 boxes, 3 oversize folders and 2 vertical files).

Anti-communist organizations in the United States